Hyderabad Football Club is a professional association football club based in Hyderabad, India, that plays in Indian Super League. The club was formed in 2019 and played its first competitive match on 25 October 2019 and lost to ATK 5–0.

List of players
The list includes all the players registered under an Hyderabad FC contract. Some players might not have featured in a professional game for the club.

List of overseas players
The list includes all the overseas players registered under an Hyderabad FC contract. Some players might not have featured in a professional game for the club.

References

Hyderabad FC players
Lists of Indian Super League players
Lists of association football players by club in India
Hyderabad FC-related lists
Association football player non-biographical articles